Luney is an surname, derived from O'Luanaigh, and related to Lunney.

Notable people with the surname include:
 Charles Luney (1905–2006), New Zealand builder and company director

See also
 Looney (disambiguation)
 Lunney

Refences

Gaelic-language surnames